Giuliano Dati (1445-1524) was a Roman Catholic prelate who served as Bishop of San Leone from 1518 to 1524.

Biography
Giuliano Dati was born in 1445. On 26 Feb 1518, he was appointed during the papacy of Pope Leo X as Bishop of San Leone. He served as Bishop of San Leone until his death in 1524.

Dati is author of three important works. The first is a 1493 adaptation into Italian ottava rima verse of the account of Christopher Columbus on his first voyage across the Atlantic Ocean. The second is the c. 1494 Treatise on the Supreme Prester John, Pope and Emperor of India and Ethiopia in which he poetically adapts earlier descriptions of Prester John and geographically conflates Ethiopia and India. The third is the c. 1495 Second Song of India describing the monsters in Prester John's realm.

Works

References 

16th-century Italian Roman Catholic bishops
Bishops appointed by Pope Leo X
1445 births
1524 deaths